Van Tassell is a town in Niobrara County, Wyoming, United States. The population was 15 at the 2010 census. It is the least populous town in the least populous county of the least populous state in the U.S.

History
A post office was established at Van Tassell in 1910 and was in operation until its discontinuation in 2017. The town was named for R. S. Van Tassell, a cattleman.

Geography
Van Tassell is located at  (42.663612, –104.091149).

Demographics

2010 census
As of the census of 2010, there were 15 people, 6 households, and 6 families residing in the town. The racial makeup of the town was 100.0% White.

There were 6 households, of which 2 had children under the age of 18 living with them, 5 were married couples living together, and 2 had a female householder with no husband present. No households were made up of single individuals. The average household size was 2.50 and the average family size was 2.50.

The median age in the town was 52.5 years. 4 residents were under the age of 18; 0 were between the ages of 18 and 24; 2 were from 25 to 44; 5 were from 45 to 64; and 4 were 65 years of age or older. The gender makeup of the town was 6 males and 9 females.

2000 census
As of the census of 2000, there were 18 people, 9 households, and 5 families residing in the town. The population density was 9.9 people per square mile (3.8/km2). There were 11 housing units at an average density of 6.0 per square mile (2.3/km2). The racial makeup of the town was 94.44% White and 5.56% Asian.

There were 9 households, out of which 33.3% had children under the age of 18 living with them, 55.6% were married couples living together, and 44.4% were non-families. 33.3% of all households were made up of individuals, and 22.2% had someone living alone who was 65 years of age or older. The average household size was 2.00 and the average family size was 2.60.

In the town, the population was spread out, with 16.7% under the age of 18, 22.2% from 25 to 44, 27.8% from 45 to 64, and 33.3% who were 65 years of age or older. The median age was 50 years. For every 100 females, there were 63.6 males. For every 100 females age 18 and over, there were 66.7 males.

The median income for a household in the town was $53,750, and the median income for a family was $53,750. Males had a median income of $40,000 versus $15,000 for females. The per capita income for the town was $17,686. None of the population or the families were below the poverty line.

Education
Public education in the town of Van Tassell is provided by Niobrara County School District #1. Schools serving the town include Lusk Elementary/Middle School (grades K–6) and Niobrara County High School (grades 7–12).

Highways
 U.S. Route 20 - east–west route through Van Tassell.
 - South Van Tassell Rd. becomes Wyoming State Route 159 to Torrington.

References

Towns in Niobrara County, Wyoming
Towns in Wyoming